Mandal-Ovoo (Rising ovoo) is a sum (district) of Ömnögovi Province in southern Mongolia. In 2009, its population was 1,954.

References 

Districts of Ömnögovi Province